Thou Shalt Not is a musical based on Émile Zola's 1867 novel Thérèse Raquin with music and lyrics by Harry Connick Jr. and an adapted book by David Thompson. The musical deals with the consequences involved in the breaking of several Commandments, in particular the sixth and seventh.  It ran on Broadway in 2001.

Production
After 22 previews which had been delayed a week due to the September 11, 2001 attacks, the musical opened at the Plymouth Theatre on October 25, 2001.  It ran until January 6, 2002 with 85 performances.  It received largely negative reviews. "Simultaneously glorious and fatally flawed, this is one Broadway failure that belongs on everybody's must-see list." The Hamilton Spectator deemed it "a fabulous failure."

Under the direction of Susan Stroman, the creative team included Thomas Lynch's scenic design, William Ivey Long's costumes, Scott Lehrer's sound design, and Peter Kaczorowski's lighting design. The cast starred Craig Bierko (Laurent LeClaire), Norbert Leo Butz (Camille Raquin), Debra Monk, and Kate Levering (Therese).

Plot
The jazz pianist Laurent LeClaire returns to New Orleans from World War II and runs into his old friend Camille Raquin who is a frail man with an overprotective mother. Camille is married to his own cousin, Therese. Laurent falls in love with Therese, they become lovers, and conspire to kill her husband. Laurent murders Camille, who is pushed over the side of a rowboat. The news of his death sends Camille's mourning mother into a crippling stroke. After waiting a year, Laurent marries his friend's widow, but every time he tries to touch her, the ghost of Camille appears and drives them apart. In time, Therese is driven into madness and suicide, and Laurent kills himself.

Musical numbers

Act I
 It's Good To Be Home – Flim Flam, Papa Jack & Ensemble
 I Need To Be In Love Ballet – Therese
 My Little World – Madame Raquin
 While You're Young – Laurent
 I Need To Be In Love – Therese
 The Other Hours – Laurent
 The Other Hours (Ballet) – Laurent & Therese
 All Things – Camille
 Sovereign Lover – Therese, Laurent & Ensemble
 I've Got My Eye On You – Madame Raquin & Camille
 Light The Way – Ensemble
 Take Her To The Mardi Gras – Laurent, Camille, Therese & Ensemble
 Tug Boat – Camille & Therese

Act II
 Tug Boat (Reprise) – Laurent
 My Little World (Reprise) – Madame Raquin
 Won't You Sanctify – Sam & Ensemble
 Time Passing – Therese, Laurent, Madame Raquin & Ensemble
 Take Advantage – Officer Michaud
 Oh! Ain't That Sweet – Camille
 Thou Shalt Not (Ballet) – Therese, Laurent & Ensemble
 I Like Love More – Laurent, Therese
 It's Good To Be Home (Reprise) – Camille

Comparison to source material
Stroman's late husband, Mike Ockrent, had asked his employees to recommend material to be adapted into musicals during his two-year production deal at Warner Bros. His assistant recommended the Zola novel, and began developing the idea in detail with the production executive. Later, when Warner Bros. passed on this, the idea and notes that were developed by Ockrent staff members were given to Stroman. Her original impulse was to make it into a ballet, but decided against it, and felt it could be strong enough as a musical. The idea for the musical Contact had also originally been developed at Ockrent's Warner Bros. office by the same two staff members, and then also offered over to Stroman by Ockrent when it didn't fly with the film studio.

Zola's novel from Paris in the 19th century, is updated to 1946-47 New Orleans in the 9th Ward, outside of the French Quarter. David Thompson explains: "New Orleans is sort of a natural cousin to Paris, in some ways. Not in all ways, but culturally... We were looking for a way for this piece to have an American sensibility to it, while retaining some of the European flavor, which New Orleans has. And the other thing that was important was to find a reason to have music a part of the story."

While Zola set much of his novel in the "dark, low, shallow" building in which the Raquins live and tend their haberdashery on the Pont-Neuf, the musical was set to a lively jazz tavern in the French Quarter run by Mme. Raquin.

Cast
The original Broadway cast of 25 included the following:
Craig Bierko – Laurent LeClaire
Leo Burmester – Officer Michaud
Norbert Leo Butz – Camille Raquin
Kate Levering – Thérèse Raquin
Debra Monk – Madame Raquin

Craig Bierko
Craig Bierko ruptured one of his vocal cords on opening night, Oct. 25, when he was accidentally hit in the larynx during a fight scene. "He finished the show and went to the opening night party," spokesman Philip Rinaldi said at the time, "but the next day he was hemorrhaging and had to be brought to the hospital. It was just a freak thing that happened." The staging of the fight scene was not altered. Standby David New took over his part from the next day, and Bierko was reported as being out with "vocal problems". After two-and-a-half weeks of vocal rest, Craig Bierko again took the stage on Nov. 13.

Kate Levering
Shortly after Bierko's return, Kate Levering sprained an ankle and was away for a few performances.

After several workshops of the show with co-star Craig Bierko, including a topless scene, Levering said: "It's a very physically draining show. The dance stuff in Thou Shalt Not is very physical. There's a lot of fighting. There's a big love ballet on this bed and kind of a rape scene. Every day that we did that workshop, I left with bruises."

Kate Levering had previously co-starred with Craig Bierko in the show The Music Man (reported in some articles as being "very close friends" at the time).

Norbert Leo Butz
Norbert Leo Butz, as the murdered husband, received a Tony nomination for Best Featured Actor in a Musical, and a Drama Desk Award nomination for Outstanding Featured Actor in a Musical.

September 11, 2001 attacks
The previews started on September 27, 2001, only a little over two weeks after the September 11, 2001 attack on the World Trade Center in New York (the original start date was Sept. 20.).  (Harry Connick's birthday, coincidentally, is September 11.)  In early previews there were audience complaints about a morgue scene, which seemed tasteless to some in the light of the Sept. 11 attacks. The scene remained in a tamer revised version.

Response
Ben Brantley, in his review for The New York Times, wrote, "It takes a singing dead man to bring a spark of life to Thou Shalt Not." The Village Voice wrote, "Unlike Zola's sexually depressed characters, everyone in the Broadway version seems to be getting it in spades...Dramatically, the bubblier context of David Thompson's book raises more questions that it cares to answer...songs that neither advance the plot nor illuminate the characters' secret logic."  Clive Barnes wrote that the musical keeps "quite faithfully to the outline and even the spirit of the original novel – which Zola himself later transposed into a play for Sarah Bernhardt – they have not only short-changed the essential drama but also failed to come up with a memorable musical."

Recording

A 77-minute original cast recording of the Tony nominated score was released on June 18, 2002.

Awards and nominations

Original Broadway production

References

External links
 
 A Conversation with David Thompson

2001 musicals
Broadway musicals
Harry Connick Jr. albums
Musicals based on novels